Chesterfield is a rural hill town in Hampshire County, Massachusetts, United States,  east of Pittsfield and  west of Boston. The population was 1,186 at the 2020 census. It is part of the Springfield, Massachusetts Metropolitan Statistical Area.

History
Chesterfield was first settled in 1760 and was officially incorporated in 1762. It was named after the Earl of Chesterfield. The town center, established after the Revolution, has well-preserved Federal period houses along Main Road. In its early days, the town supported a largely agricultural economy, with wool from Merino sheep as a major product. However, there were sawmills and tanneries in operation as well as cloth dressing mills, and in the early 19th century these superseded farming and brought in a small immigrant population that was mostly Irish. Progress wiped out most of the industry in Chesterfield, and by the start of the 20th century a re-emerging agricultural economy developed alongside the growing trade from summer residents.

Geography
Chesterfield's location is nearly equidistant from the northern, southern and western state lines of Massachusetts.

Education

Chesterfield is part of the Hampshire Regional School District along with Goshen, Southampton, Westhampton, and Williamsburg. Students attend K–6 at New Hingham Regional Elementary School along with Goshen, and 7–12 students attend Hampshire Regional High School.

Points of interest
Chesterfield Gorge along the Westfield River, a property of the Trustees of Reservations.

Demographics

At the 2000 census, there were 1,201 people, 447 households and 324 families residing in the town. There were 524 housing units at an average density of 16.8 per square mile (6.5/km2). The racial makeup of the town was 98.67% White, 0.25% Asian, 0.25% Pacific Islander, 0.08% from other races, and 0.75% from two or more races. Hispanic or Latino of any race were 0.08% of the population.

There were 447 households, of which 34.0% had children under the age of 18 living with them, 60.6% were married couples living together, 7.8% had a female householder with no husband present, and 27.3% were non-families. Of all households, 18.8% were made up of individuals, and 6.5% had someone living alone who was 65 years of age or older. The average household size was 2.69 and the average family size was 3.09.

Of the population 25.7% were under the age of 18, 6.1% from 18 to 24, 29.8% from 25 to 44, 28.6% from 45 to 64, and 9.7% who were 65 years of age or older. The median age was 54 years. For every 100 females, there were 99.5 males. For every 100 females age 18 and over, there were 96.0 males.

The median household income was $49,063 and the median family income was $57,361. Males had a median income of $35,417 versus $27,788 for females. The per capita income for the town was $19,220. About 3.4% of families and 5.7% of the population were below the poverty line, including 5.7% of those under age 18 and 3.4% of those age 65 or over.

References

External links 

 Town of Chesterfield official website
 "MHC Survey Reconnaissance Town Report: Chesterfield" Massachusetts Historical Commission, 1982.

 
Springfield metropolitan area, Massachusetts
Towns in Hampshire County, Massachusetts
Towns in Massachusetts